Richard Shore Smith (December 11, 1877 – May 19, 1953) was an American football player and coach.  He played college football at the University of Oregon from 1896 to 1899 and then at Columbia University, where he attended law school.  Playing as a fullback for Columbia in 1903, Smith was named an All-American.  He served as the head football coach at Oregon in 1904 and again in 1925, compiling a record of 6–8–1.  Smith practiced law in Oregon and was president of the First National Bank in Eugene, Oregon.  He died at the age of 74 on May 19, 1953 at his home in Eugene.

Head coaching record

References

1877 births
1953 deaths
19th-century players of American football
American football fullbacks
Columbia Lions football players
Oregon Ducks football coaches
Oregon Ducks football players
Columbia Law School alumni
Oregon lawyers
All-American college football players
Sportspeople from Eugene, Oregon